Carrington Island is a 1,200-acre island located in the Great Salt Lake in northern Utah, United States. It is the fourth-largest island in the lake.

History 
Carrington Island is named for Utah pioneer and apostle of the Church of Jesus Christ of Latter-Day Saints Albert Carrington. Lambourne's Rock (elevation 4727 feet) at the summit of the island is named for painter Alfred Lambourne.

Charles Stoddard filed a homestead claim on the island in 1932 and built a cabin, but left the island after his well produced only saltwater.

The US Army operated the Carrington Island Precision Bombing Range on the island during World War II. Its surface remains pockmarked with bomb craters from this era. As the island was never cleaned up due to its remote location, unexploded ordnance may still be present. SAC Bay on the island's southeastern shore and SAC point on the island's southern tip were named for the Strategic Air Command during the island's use as a bombing range.

Brine shrimp harvesters in the area operate a radio repeater on the summit of the island.

Access 
The northwestern 542 acres of the island are privately owned by the Six Mile Ranch Co. of Grantsville, UT.  The remainder of the island is public land managed by the Bureau of Land Management. Sandbars connect the island to Stansbury Island and to the mainland but are cut by canals.

See also 

 Stansbury Island
 Gunnison Island

References

Further reading 

 

Lake islands
Great Salt Lake
Islands of Utah
Lake islands of Utah